The Moons of Jupiter may refer to:

 Moons of Jupiter, the natural satellites of the planet Jupiter
 Galilean moons, the four largest moons and first discovered of Jupiter, by Galileo
 Rings of Jupiter
 Jupiter's moons in fiction
 The Moons of Jupiter (1982 book), by Alice Munro, an anthology containing the eponymous short story
 The Moons of Jupiter (short story) (1981 story), by Alice Munro
 Lucky Starr and the Moons of Jupiter (1957 novel) novel by Isaac Asimov in the Lucky Starr novel series
 Moons of Jupiter (album), 1997 jazz album by Steve Swell
 Moons of Jupiter, 1998 album by Scruffy The Cat

See also
 Jupiter Moon (1990 TV show) British SF soap opera
 Jupiter's Moon (2017 film)
 Jupiter (disambiguation)
 Moon (disambiguation)